Anglards-de-Salers is a commune in the Cantal department in the Auvergne region of south-central France.

The inhabitants of the commune are known as Anglardois or Anglardoises

Geography
Anglards-de-Salers is located some 60 km west by north-west of Saint-Flour and 15 km south of Ydes. It can be accessed by the D122 road from Mauriac in the west to the village. There is also the minor D22 road from Méallet in the north to the village which continues as a more major road to Salers in the south-east. The D222 road also comes to the village from Salins in the west. The D12 road from Veyrieres in the north also passes inside the north-eastern border of the commune and continues to Le Falgoux to the south-east of the commune. The D212 roads goes west from the D12 to the village. There are a number of small hamlets in the commune. These are:

Les Aldieres
Bagnac
Baliergues
La Bastide
Bouisse
Le Breuil
Le Caire
Le Chambon
Chapsieres
Epinasolles
Fignac
Fournols
Haut Bagnac
Joncoux
Longvergne
Maleprade
Montclard
Noux
Nuzerolles
Le Peil
Pepanie
Pons
Pradelles
Sarrette
Le Viaureau
Voleyrac

Other than a belt of forest along the north of the commune, the commune is entirely farmland.

The Mars stream flows through the north of the commune from the east joined by the Ruisseau de Veysset in the north of the commune then continuing north to join the Sumene at Vendes. There is also the Auze stream flowing through the heart of the commune towards the west where it joins the Sione east of Escorailles. The Monzola also flows west in the south joining the Auze just west of the commune. Several other unnamed streams flow into these streams.

History

List of Priests for Anglards-de-Salers

List of Priests

Heraldry

Administration

List of Successive Mayors

Population

Culture and heritage

Civil heritage
The commune has a number of buildings and structures that are registered as historical monuments:
The Espradel Garden (19th century)
The Chateau de Longevergne (1905)
The Château de la Trémolière (15th century) The chateau houses a collection of Aubusson tapestries from the 16th century called the "bestiaire fantastique" (fantastic bestiary). The Chateau contains two items that are registered as historical objects:
4 sets of Wood Panelling
11 Tapestries (16th century)
The Montbrun Garden

Other sites of interest
The Deduit Orchard is a creation by landscapers Ossart and Maurières: a contemporary medieval garden inspired by the Roman de la rose and the bestiaire fantastique collection.
Walking trails in the mountain pastures with a plan table
Robert Besogne Stadium is a football stadium hosting the EAS (Entente Anglards Salers)

Religious heritage
The Church of Saint-Thyrse (12th century) is registered as an historical monument. The Church contains two items that are registered as historical objects:
The face of the Altar: Descent from the Cross (16th century)
A Group Sculpture: Virgin of Pity (17th century)

Notable people linked to the commune
Paul Malassagne, Senator for Cantal, was born at Nuzerolles

See also
Communes of the Cantal department

References

External links
Anglards-de-Salers on the National Geographic Institute website 
Anglards-de-Salers on Géoportail, National Geographic Institute (IGN) website 
Anglars on the 1750 Cassini Map

Communes of Cantal